A by-election was held for the New South Wales Legislative Assembly seat of Castlereagh on 23 February 1980 due to the resignation of Jack Renshaw.

Dates

Result 
				

Jack Renshaw resigned.

See also
Electoral results for the district of Castlereagh
List of New South Wales state by-elections

References 

1980 elections in Australia
New South Wales state by-elections
1980s in New South Wales